Neel Burton (born in Mauritius, Indian Ocean) is a British psychiatrist, philosopher, writer, and educator. He is the author of several books, including Psychiatry (2006), Living with Schizophrenia (2007), The Meaning of Madness (2008), Master your Mind (2009), Heaven and Hell: The Psychology of the Emotions (2015), and Hypersanity: Thinking Beyond Thinking (2019).

References

External links 

1978 births
Living people
British psychiatrists